Paul Woolford (born 1976) is a British dance music producer and DJ from Leeds, Yorkshire, who also uses the aliases Bobby Peru and Special Request, such as on the underground hit, "Erotic Discourse".

Biography
An adoptee, Woolford grew up in Leeds with his brother Mark. Paul was inspired by the club night Back to Basics, eventually becoming a resident there. Starting in 2008, he was a weekly resident of We Love Space, which was a long-running Sunday party at Space in Ibiza. He constantly tours to play guest spots in addition to his residency and owns the record label, Intimacy.

Woolford scored a hit single in 2020 with "Looking for Me", a collaboration with American DJ and producer Diplo, featuring vocals from American singer Kareen Lomax. The single peaked at number four in the UK Singles Chart and reached number-one in Ireland.

Discography

Singles

References

External links
 Short biography from The End

| DJ Profile | We Love - official site | Ibiza

1976 births
Living people
English record producers
English adoptees
English dance musicians
DJs from Leeds
Electronic dance music DJs